Trinity School is a Church of England Secondary Academy located in Belvedere in the London Borough of Bexley. It is a mixed non-selective school located within a selective borough.

Introduction 
Trinity School is the only Church of England secondary school in the London Borough of Bexley, an area with grammar schools. It is in the Diocese of Rochester; it acts as lead school in the Trinitas Trust. It became an academy in April 2011.
It is an average-sized secondary school. Approximately half of the pupils are White British and a third of pupils are from a Black African heritage. The proportion of pupils who are eligible for support through the pupil premium funding is in line with the national average; these pupils are entitled to free school meals or are in the care of the local authority. The school has a higher than average proportion of disabled pupils and the percentage of children with special educational needs is above the national average.

The Trinitas Academy Trust has three schools, joining Trinity with Christ Church (Erith) and St Augustine of Canterbury Primary Schools. The Academy Trust is led by a board of directors which includes members of the governing bodies, representatives of the Bishop of Rochester and the Diocesan Board of Education. A Chief Executive has overall responsibility for the Trust and the Primary Academies are led by an Executive Head Teacher working with Heads of School.

Facilities 
The following buildings house the following areas:-
 Canterbury Block - English, French, Science, LSC, Canteen, Chapel and the Library
 Chichester Block - French, German and Special Educational Needs
 Rochester Block - Mathematics, ICT & Computer Science
 Durham Block - Reception, Dance, Drama, Music, Head Teacher's office and other office space
 York Block - Product Design, History, Geography, RE, Catering, Art & Textiles
 Winchester Block - Main Hall, Small Gym and the Inclusion Room
 Salisbury Block - PE Department
Westminster - The Sixth Form Centre - Westminster Hall, Sixth Form Study Room and Sixth Form Classrooms

Curriculum 
Virtually all maintained schools and academies follow the National Curriculum, and are inspected by Ofsted on how well they succeed in delivering a 'broad and balanced curriculum'. Schools try to get all students to achieve the English Baccalaureate (EBACC) qualification - this must include core subjects, a modern foreign language and either History or Geography.

Trinity operates a three-year, Key Stage 3 where all the required National Curriculum subjects are taught.

Key Stage 3

At Key Stage 3 pupils learn the following subjects.

 Art
 Catering
 ICT & Computer Science
 Citizenship
 Design & Technology
 English
 Expressive Arts
 Geography
 History
 Maths
 Modern Foreign Languages
 Music
 Physical Education
 Religious Education
 Science
 
Key Stage 4

At Key Stage 4 pupils can take on any of the above subjects as a GCSE qualification (except citizenship). However, all pupils must study English Language, English Literature, Mathematics, Science and ICT or choose from a new course such as:-

 Business Studies
 Computing
 Construction
 Dance
 Drama
 Media Studies
 Psychology
 Science (Additional or Triple)
 Sociology
 Government & Politics
 Law

Sixth Form

Once pupils reach sixth form they can then choose to study all of the above subjects at AS level all of the way through to A2 level. In sixth form pupils are no longer required to wear full school uniform, but are required to dress in smart business attire.

Extra-curricular activities 
The extra curricular activities in the PE department include:

 Football
 Netball
 Rowing
 Badminton
 Basketball
 Tennis
 Rugby
 Hockey

As well as sports there are academic extra - circular activities which are:
 Politics Debate Club
 Model House of Commons Debates
 Model United Nations Conferences
 ICT Club
 Homework Club

Notable former pupils
 Tony Discipline who plays Tyler Moon in the BBC 1 soap EastEnders

References

External links
Trinitas Academy Trust School's
 Trinity Church of England School
 St Augustine of Canterbury C of E Primary School
 Christ Church (Erith) C of E Primary School

OFSTED Reports
 Alternative education subject survey (2013)
 School inspection report (2011)

Academies in the London Borough of Bexley
Educational institutions established in 1946
1946 establishments in England
Church of England secondary schools in the Diocese of Rochester
Secondary schools in the London Borough of Bexley